Branchinecta mexicana is a species of fairy shrimp in the family Branchinectidae. It is found in Central America.

The IUCN conservation status of Branchinecta mexicana is "CR", critically endangered. The species faces an extremely high risk of extinction in the immediate future. The IUCN status was reviewed in 1996.

References

Further reading

 

Anostraca
Articles created by Qbugbot
Crustaceans described in 1992